Wilson Worsdell (7 September 1850 – 14 April 1920) was an English locomotive engineer who was locomotive superintendent of the North Eastern Railway from 1890 to 1910. He was the younger brother of T.W. Worsdell. Wilson was born at Monks Coppenhall, near Crewe on 7 September 1850 to Nathaniel and Mary Worsdell; he was their tenth child and fourth son. In 1860 he was sent as a boarder to Ackworth, a Quaker school in Yorkshire.

Career
Wilson Worsdell worked at Crewe for a short time, then moved to the USA to work at the Altoona Works of the Pennsylvania Railroad. He returned to England in 1871 and worked for the London and North Western Railway (LNWR) and rose to be in charge of the locomotive shed at Chester.. In 1883, he became an Assistant Locomotive Superintendent of the North Eastern Railway (NER). Wilson's brother, Thomas William Worsdell was Locomotive Superintendent of the NER from 1885 to 1890. When Thomas William retired, Wilson replaced him as the NER's Locomotive Superintendent, in which capacity he was a popular choice. In this capacity he was considered a mechanical genius being able to pinpoint problems with unerring accuracy. He also implemented the electrification of the lines in North Tyneside. He retired in May 1910.

Patents
Wilson Worsdell has only one known patent:
 GB190716980 (with Walter Reuben Preston), published 23 July 1908, Improvements in and connected with blast pipes of locomotives

Family
Wilson Worsdell was a son of Nathaniel Worsdell (1809–1886), and grandson of the coachbuilder Thomas Clarke Worsdell (1788–1862). His eldest brother, William (1838–1916), was also a locomotive engineer. T. C. Worsdell had become a Quaker at some point between 1812 and 1816, and his descendants, including Nathaniel, William and Wilson, were brought up in the Quaker faith.

Wilson married Mary Elizabeth Bradford, daughter of a Draper, in Staffordshire in 1882.

Locomotive Designs

NER Class L (LNER Class J73) 0-6-0T
NER Class M/3CC (LNER Class D19) 4-4-0
NER Class M1 (LNER Class D17/1,D17/2 and D18) 4-4-0
NER Class N (LNER Class N9) 0-6-2T
NER Class O (LNER Class G5) 0-4-4T
NER Class P (LNER Class J24) 0-6-0
NER Class P1 (LNER Class J25) 0-6-0
NER Class P2 (LNER Class J26) 0-6-0
NER Class P3 (LNER Class J27) 0-6-0
NER Class E1 (LNER Class J72) 0-6-0T
NER Class R (LNER Class D20) 4-4-0
NER Class R1 (LNER Class D21) 4-4-0
NER Class S (LNER Class B13) 4-6-0
NER Class S1 (LNER Class B14) 4-6-0
NER Class T (LNER Class Q5) 0-8-0
NER Class U (LNER Class N10) 0-6-2T
NER Class V (LNER Class C6) 4-4-2
NER Class V/09 (LNER Class C6) 4-4-2
NER Class W (LNER Class A6) 4-6-0T
NER Class X (LNER Class T1) 4-8-0T
NER Class Y (LNER Class A7) 4-6-2T

References

Citations

References

1850 births
1920 deaths
People educated at Ackworth School
English engineers
English Quakers
Locomotive builders and designers
Locomotive superintendents
English railway mechanical engineers
North Eastern Railway (UK) people